This was the first edition of the tournament.

Go Soeda won the title, defeating Chung Hyeon in the final, 3–6, 6–3, 6–3.

Seeds

Draw

Finals

Top half

Bottom half

References
 Main Draw
 Qualifying Draw

Lecoq Seoul Open - Singles
2015 Singles